Sgurgola is a comune (municipality) in the Province of Frosinone in the Italian region Lazio, located about  southeast of Rome and about  west of Frosinone.  

Sgurgola borders the following municipalities: Anagni, Ferentino, Gorga, Morolo.

References

External links
 Official website

Cities and towns in Lazio